Jānis Ikaunieks (born 16 February 1995) is a Latvian professional footballer who plays as an attacking midfielder for Rīgas FS and the Latvia national football team.

Club career

Liepājas Metalurgs 
Ikaunieks was born in Kuldīga. As a youth player he played for the youth teams of Liepājas Metalurgs. Ikaunieks scored 11 goals in 20 matches in the 2012 First League season contributing to Liepājas Metalurgs II winning the championship. In 2013, he was promoted to the first team. On 7 April 2013, he made his debut in the Higher League in a 2–1 defeat against FK Daugava. Throughout his professional debut season, Ikaunieks played 19 league matches and scored three goals. After the end of the season the club was dissolved, due to financial difficulties, and as a result Ikaunieks alongside other players transferred to its successor, the newly established FK Liepāja.

FK Liepāja
Starting the season as a nominal substitute, Ikaunieks strikingly rose to the first eleven and was named Higher League player of the month in May. On 11 June 2014, Ikaunieks scored four goals in a 7–0 victory over FC Jūrmala. All in all, he scored 23 goals in 32 league matches and became the second top scorer of the championship behind Vladislavs Gutkovskis from Skonto. In August 2014, Ikaunieks went on trial with the Croatian Prva HNL champions Dinamo Zagreb. In September, he was named player of the month for the second time in the season. In October, explicit interest in the player was reported from Ajax, Metz, VfB Stuttgart and Udinese Calcio. On 5 December 2014, Ikaunieks was named the best midfielder of the season and was simultaneously voted as the best player of the 2014 Higher League.

Metz
On 23 December 2014, Metz chairman Bernard Serin confirmed that Ikaunieks would join the Ligue 1 side on a four-year deal. The transfer on an undisclosed fee was officially affirmed on 7 January 2015. Ikaunieks made his debut for Metz’ first team on 20 January 2015, coming on as a substitute in the Coupe de France 1/16 finals match victory over US Avranches. He made his Ligue 1 debut in a 0–0 draw against Nice on 31 January.

AEL
In December 2016, Ikaunieks joined Greek Superleague team AEL on a six-month loan deal. On 4 January 2017, Ikaunieks made his debut in a 2–1 victory over Veria. On 18 January, against Veria once again, he scored his only goal for AEL in a match that ended 1–1. Reportedly, there was no buy option in the loan agreement and thus he returned to Metz at the end of the season.

FK Liepāja
On 15 June 2017, it was announced that Ikaunieks had returned to FK Liepāja, while on loan from Metz. He made his first match on 18 June, in a 1–0 victory over Ventspils. He only managed to make a total of seven matches, six in the league and in the cup final in which Liepāja lifted the trophy against Riga FC, due to being out for two months after suffering from a metatarsal fracture. After the conclusion of his loan deal, Ikaunieks joined Liepāja on a permanent basis.

He instantly became an important asset in the 2018 Higher League season, scoring nine goals in 17 matches as well as being involved in the assistance of three goals. Once again being unlucky with injuries, he suffered from a shoulder injury at the end of August and was out for about three months.

Returning strong for the 2019 Higher League season, Ikaunieks scored seven goals in 24 matches, as well as scoring one goal in a Europa League qualifying match against Dinamo Minsk.

Strømsgodset
On 11 February 2020, Ikaunieks signed for Norwegian Eliteserien team Strømsgodset. He made his debut on 17 June against IK Start in a 2–2 draw. On 1 August 2020, having spent only a few months with the team and having only played six matches, Ikaunieks and Strømsgodset agreed on mutual termination of the contract.

Rīgas FS 
On 6 August 2020, Ikaunieks returned to Latvia and signed for Higher League club Rīgas FS. He made his debut on 8 August against his old club Liepāja in a 3–0 victory. On 12 August, he scored his first goal in a 4–0 victory over Jelgava.

KuPS 
On 22 February 2021, Ikaunieks signed a two-year contract with Finnish Veikkausliiga team KuPS.

International career
Ikaunieks was a member of the Latvia U18, Latvia U19 and Latvia U21 national teams. He made his debut for Latvia on 13 October 2014, playing the entire 90 minutes in a 1–1 UEFA Euro 2016 qualifying draw against Turkey. It was later calculated that he had repeated the record of Māris Verpakovskis who debuted in 1999, being exactly 19 years, 7 months and 25 days old. On 29 March 2016, in a 5–0 friendly victory over Gibraltar, Ikaunieks scored his first two goals for his country. He has been marked as one of the best Latvians of his generation and has been linked with clubs such as Real Madrid, Manchester City, and Borussia Dortmund.

Personal life
His elder brother Dāvis is also a professional footballer, currently playing for FK Jablonec in the Czech First League.

Career statistics

Club

International 

Scores and results list Latvia's goal tally first, score column indicates score after each Ikaunieks' goal.

Honours
Liepājas Metalurgs II
 Latvian First League: 2012

FK Liepāja
 Latvian Football Cup: 2017

Latvia
 Baltic Cup: 2018
 Baltic Cup runner-up: 2022

Individual
 Latvian Higher League Player of the Year: 2014
 Latvian Higher League Midfielder of the Year: 2014
Veikkausliiga Team of the Year: 2022

References

External links
 
 
 

1995 births
Living people
People from Kuldīga
Latvian footballers
Latvia international footballers
Association football midfielders
FK Liepājas Metalurgs players
FK Liepāja players
FC Metz players
Athlitiki Enosi Larissa F.C. players
Strømsgodset Toppfotball players
FK RFS players
Kuopion Palloseura players
Eliteserien players
Latvian Higher League players
Ligue 1 players
Ligue 2 players
Championnat National 2 players
Super League Greece players
Latvian expatriate footballers
Expatriate footballers in France
Expatriate footballers in Greece
Expatriate footballers in Norway
Expatriate footballers in Finland
Latvian expatriate sportspeople in France
Latvian expatriate sportspeople in Greece
Latvian expatriate sportspeople in Norway
Latvian expatriate sportspeople in Finland